Delamain is a producer of  cognac, based in Jarnac, France. Delamain is one of the oldest Cognac houses and has been continuously family run since its establishment in 1824 although its roots in the cognac trade go back even further, beginning shortly after the arrival in France of Irishman James Delamain in 1751. Nine generations later, James's direct descendant, Charles Braastad, serves as Delamain Cognac's Managing Director.

The House of Delamain only produces XO and above cognacs and only produces cognacs produced from eaux de vie from cognac's Grande Champagne region, which is widely recognized as cognac's finest terroir. This XO-only, Grande Champagne-only focus is unique amongst cognac houses.

In 2017, the Bollinger champagne and wine group deepened a longstanding relationship with the House of Delamain and became Delamain's majority shareholder. 

In 2020, the House of Delamain celebrated the 100th anniversary of its flagship cognac, Pale & Dry XO. Also in 2020, Delamain launched its Pléiade range, a collection of limited-edition single vintage and/or single vineyard cognacs.  

In July 2021 Delamain was elected to membership of the Comité Colbert, a non-profit association known as the “Voice of French Luxury”, composed of France's most important crafted luxury goods and services. In announcing the election to membership, the Comité Colbert cited Delamain's “history, deep respect for traditions, including the value of inherited wisdom and the patience necessary to achieve excellence.”

Products
Range
Pale & Dry X.O. Aged 25 years
Vesper Aged 35 years
Extra. Older than Vesper
Tres Vénérable.  Aged 55 years
Reserve de la Famille.  43% vol. This is produced from a single barrel and from a single estate. This is Delamain's highest range product.

Limited editions
Millésimes (Vintage) Cognacs.  This is a cognac from a single year. Aged 30 years.
Le Voyage de Delamain. The finest expression of Delamain, from their oldest eau de vie, in Baccarat crystal and leather. Limited to 500 units worldwide.

References

External links
Delamain-Homepage
Cognacguide.com

Cognac
Distilleries in France